Martin Petr (born 14 March 1999) is a Czech professional footballer who plays as a midfielder for MFK Skalica.

Club career

MFK Skalica
Petr made his professional Fortuna Liga debut for MFK Skalica on 22 July 2022 against FC ViOn Zlaté Moravce.

References

External links
 MFK Skalica official club profile 
 
 
 Futbalnet profile 

1999 births
Living people
Sportspeople from Plzeň
Czech footballers
Association football midfielders
MFK Skalica players
2. Liga (Slovakia) players
Slovak Super Liga players
Expatriate footballers in Slovakia
Czech expatriate sportspeople in Slovakia